The 1953 Italian general election was held in Italy on Sunday 7 June 1953.

"Scam law"
The election was characterized by changes in the electoral law. Even if the general structure remained uncorrupted, the government introduced a superbonus of two thirds of seats in the Chamber of Deputies for the coalition which would obtain at-large the absolute majority of votes. The change was hugely opposed by the opposition parties as well as the smaller Christian Democracy's coalition partners, which had no realistic chances of success. The new law was called "scam law" by its detractors, including some dissidents of minor government parties who founded special opposition groups to deny the artificial landslide to Christian Democracy. Its parliamentarian exam had a disruptive effect: "Among the iron pots of political forces that faced in the Cold War, Senate cracked as earthenware pot."

Historical background
In the 1950s, Italy became a founding member of the NATO alliance (1949), a member of the United Nations (1955) and an ally of the United States, which helped to revive the Italian economy through the Marshall Plan. In the same years, Italy also became a founding member of the European Coal and Steel Community (1952) and of the European Economic Community (1957), later developed into the European Union. At the end of the 1950s an impressive economic growth was termed "Economic Miracle". Italian families used their newfound wealth to purchase consumer durables for the first time. Between 1958 and 1965, the percentage of families owning a television rose from 12% to 49%, washing machines from 3% to 23%, and fridges from 13% to 55%.

Christian Democracy's main support areas, sometimes known as "vote tanks", were the rural areas in South, Center, and North-East Italy, whereas the industrial North-West had more left-leaning support because of the larger working class. An interesting exception were the "red regions" (Emilia Romagna, Tuscany, and Umbria) where the Italian Communist Party has historically had a wide support. This is considered a consequence of the particular sharecropping ("mezzadria") farming contracts used in these regions.

The Holy See actively supported Christian Democracy, judging it would be a mortal sin for a Catholic to vote for the Communist party and excommunicating all its supporters; however, in practice many Communists remained religious, and Emilia was known to be an area where people were both religious and communists. Giovanni Guareschi wrote his novels about Don Camillo describing a village, Brescello, whose inhabitants are at the same time loyal to priest Camillo and communist mayor Peppone, who are fierce rivals.

In 1953, a Parliamentary Commission on poverty estimated that 24% of Italian families were either "destitute" or "in hardship", 21% of dwellings were overcrowded, 52% of homes in the South had no running drinking water, and only 57% had a lavatory. In the 1950s, several important reforms were launched, such as agrarian reform (Scelba law), fiscal reform (Vanoni law), and the country enjoyed a period of economic boom and development (miracolo economico, or "economic miracle"). In this period of time, a massive population transfer, from the impoverished South to the booming industrial North, took place. This exacerbated social contrasts, including between the old-established "worker aristocracy" and the new less qualified immigrants ("operaio-massa") of Southern origin. In addition, a wide gap between rich and poor continued to exist. By the end of the 1960s, it was estimated that 4 million Italians (out of a population of 54.5 million) were unemployed, underemployed, and casual labourers. As noted by the historian Paul Ginsborg, the affluent society to this section of the Italian population "might have meant a television set but precious little else."

Parties and leaders

Results
The complaint campaign of the oppositions against the "scam law" reached its goal. The centrist coalition (DC, PSDI, PLI, PRI, SVP, and PSd'Az) won 49.9% of the national vote, coming just a few thousand votes short of the threshold for a two-thirds majority; the election resulted in an ordinary proportional distribution of the seats. Minor dissident parties resulted determinant for the final result, especially the short-lived National Democratic Alliance. DC, the leading party, did not repeat the result of five years before, which had been obtained under special conditions linked to the Cold War, and lost a lot of votes to the right wing, which included resurgent Italian Fascist and neo-fascist politicians, particularly in Southern Italy.

While the government won the election with a clear working majority of seats in both houses, frustration at the failure to garner the expected supermajority caused big problems for the leading coalition. Alcide De Gasperi was forced to resign by the Italian Parliament on August 2; he retired and died twelve months later. The legislature continued with weak governments, with minor parties refusing institutional responsibilities. Giuseppe Pella rose to power but fell after five months only following strong disputes about the status of the Free Territory of Trieste, which Pella was claiming. Amintore Fanfani not receiving a vote of confidence, Mario Scelba and Antonio Segni followed with more traditional centrist coalitions supported by the PSDI and the PLI; under the administration of the first one, the problem of Trieste was closed ceding Koper to Yugoslavia. The parliamentary term was closed by the minority government chaired by Adone Zoli, finishing a legislature which hugely weakened the office of the Prime Minister, held by six different rulers.

Chamber of Deputies

By constituency

Senate of the Republic

By constituency

Maps

References

Italy
General election
General elections in Italy
Italian general election
Election and referendum articles with incomplete results